Anna Rohrer (born February 24, 1997) is an American long-distance runner and former student-athlete at the University of Notre Dame. She won four high school national championships and was named the Foot Locker female cross country athlete of the year in 2015.

High school
Rohrer attended Mishawaka High School, in Mishawaka, Indiana, where she was a star track and cross country athlete.

Rohrer won the 2012 5,000 m Foot Locker Cross Country Championships, in a time of 17:25 and the 2014 event in 17:13.

Rohrer received her 2014–15 Cross Country Gatorade Player of the Year awards from the University of Notre Dame alumnus and USA Track & Field national champion, Molly Huddle.

Rohrer won the 2014 NBNO 5000 title in a time of 16:10 at New Balance Outdoor Nationals.

Rohrer also won her fourth national title at the 2014 New Balance Indoor Nationals, setting an indoor record of 16:10.79 in the girls 5,000 meter race.

Rohrer ran 17:08.8 to win the 2014 IHSAA State Cross Country Championship, 17:13.2 to win the 2012 IHSAA State Cross Country Championship. In the 2015 IHSAA State Track and Field Championship, she ran 4:52.09 to win the 1600m title, and 10:11.20 to win the 3200m title at the. She ran 10:14.43 to win the 3200m title at the 2014 IHSAA State Track and Field Championship, ran 10:20.68 to win the 3200m title at the 2013 IHSAA State Track and Field Championship, and as a freshman, ran 11:11.04 to place 17th in the 3200m at the 2012 IHSAA State Track and Field Championship.

Mishawaka Mayor Dave Wood presented Rohrer with a key to the city, proclaiming December 8, 2012, Anna Rohrer National Champion Day.

NCAA 
Rohrer attends University of Notre Dame.

In 2017, Rohrer won ACC Outdoor Championship titles at 5,000 and 10,000 meters.

On June 7, 2018, Rohrer finished sixth in the NCAA Division I Outdoors 10,000 meters, although her time was under the existing 30-year-old event record.

Rohrer placed 10th in 2018 NCAA Division I Cross Country Championships leading the Notre Dame Fighting Irish women's cross country to an 8th-place team finish.

On June 6, 2019, Rohrer repeated her 6th-place finish in the 10,000 meters at 2019 NCAA Division I Outdoor Track and Field Championships.

As of June 2019, Rohrer is a 5-time Atlantic Coast Conference champion, 8-time USTFCCCA NCAA Division I First and Second Team All-American.

Open competition

In April 2017, she ran a world-leading 31:58.99 to win the 10,000m at the Stanford Invitational, earning USA Track & Field Athlete of the Week honors.

References

External links
 2014–15 Gatorade National Girls Cross Country Player of the Year
 Mishawaka High School Athletic profile
 Mishawaka High School in June 2015 MileSplit articles
 
 
 Coaching a National Champion

1997 births
Living people
Notre Dame Fighting Irish women's track and field athletes
Notre Dame Fighting Irish women's cross country runners
Sportspeople from South Bend, Indiana
People from Mishawaka, Indiana
Sportspeople from Indiana
American female middle-distance runners
American female long-distance runners
Track and field athletes from Indiana